The Party of Labour (PR) is a Marxist–Leninist political party in Serbia.

History 
The party was founded in March 1992 by Vlado Dapčević, a Montenegrin anti-revisionist communist, who was a long-time political prisoner in the Socialist Federal Republic of Yugoslavia. Dapčević, a dissident during the one-party rule of the  League of Communists of Yugoslavia, formed the party after the introduction of multi-party system. Party members were not allowed to take a part in wars in Croatia and Bosnia and Herzegovina. In September 1997 the Party program and Status were adopted, with a call to create a wide front and fight the regime. Activists took part in the overthrow of Slobodan Milošević. Dapčević died in 2001. The Second Party Congress was in July 2002. Party members took part in many protests over the years, including anti-NATO protests in Belgrade, along with other left-wing organizations. Party of Labour supported the independence of Montenegro.

Activities 
While seeking revolution, its political activities are limited to organizing demonstrations and carrying out propaganda activities. The party is active in both Serbia and Montenegro. The party is a member of the International Coordination of Revolutionary Parties and Organizations.

References

External links
 

1992 establishments in Serbia
Anti-revisionist organizations
Communist parties in Montenegro
Communist parties in Serbia
Far-left politics in Serbia
International Conference of Marxist–Leninist Parties and Organizations (International Newsletter)
International Coordination of Revolutionary Parties and Organizations
Labour parties
Political parties established in 1992